Stanislau Hladchenka (born 14 September 1994) is a Belarusian male freestyle skier. He competed in the men's aerials event during the 2018 Winter Olympics.

References 

1994 births
Living people
Belarusian male freestyle skiers
Freestyle skiers at the 2018 Winter Olympics
Freestyle skiers at the 2022 Winter Olympics
Olympic freestyle skiers of Belarus
Sportspeople from Minsk